Eddy Boudel Tan is a Canadian writer from Vancouver, British Columbia, whose 2020 debut novel After Elias was a finalist for the 2021 ReLit Award for fiction.

Inspired by the Germanwings Flight 9525, After Elias centres on a gay man coping with the death of his husband-to-be in a plane crash just days before their wedding.

Boudel Tan was one of five writers named to the Writers' Trust of Canada's annual Rising Stars mentorship program in 2021. In July he published his second novel, The Rebellious Tide.

Boudel Tan, openly gay, is the son of immigrants from Brunei.

References

21st-century Canadian novelists
21st-century Canadian male writers
Canadian male novelists
Canadian LGBT novelists
Canadian gay writers
Canadian writers of Asian descent
Writers from Vancouver
Living people
Year of birth missing (living people)
Gay novelists
21st-century Canadian LGBT people